Avery Creek is a census-designated place (CDP) in Buncombe County, North Carolina, United States. The population was 1,950 at the 2010 census. It is part of the Asheville Metropolitan Statistical Area.

Geography
Avery Creek is located in southern Buncombe County at  (35.460353, -82.578828). The main road through the community is North Carolina Highway 191 (Brevard Road), leading north  to downtown Asheville and south  to Hendersonville.

Demographics

As of the census of 2000, there were 1,405 people, 561 households, and 414 families residing in the CDP. The population density was 818.8 people per square mile (315.4/km2). There were 584 housing units at an average density of 340.3 per square mile (131.1/km2). The racial makeup of the CDP was 95.02% White, 2.92% African American, 0.28% Native American, 0.50% Asian, 0.28% from other races, and 1.00% from two or more races. Hispanic or Latino of any race were 1.35% of the population.

There were 561 households, out of which 30.5% had children under the age of 18 living with them, 64.0% were married couples living together, 7.0% had a female householder with no husband present, and 26.2% were non-families. 21.4% of all households were made up of individuals, and 4.6% had someone living alone who was 65 years of age or older. The average household size was 2.50 and the average family size was 2.92.

In the CDP, the population was spread out, with 22.5% under the age of 18, 7.2% from 18 to 24, 32.0% from 25 to 44, 26.4% from 45 to 64, and 12.0% who were 65 years of age or older. The median age was 39 years. For every 100 females, there were 93.3 males. For every 100 females age 18 and over, there were 90.7 males.

The median income for a household in the CDP was $47,619, and the median income for a family was $51,042. Males had a median income of $41,123 versus $28,281 for females. The per capita income for the CDP was $22,386. About 4.9% of families and 4.9% of the population were below the poverty line, including 11.7% of those under age 18 and none of those age 65 or over.

References

External links
 City Data - Avery Creek

Unincorporated communities in North Carolina
Census-designated places in Buncombe County, North Carolina
Census-designated places in North Carolina
Asheville metropolitan area